Guanyin Ancient Temple is a Buddhist temple located in Chuanying District of Jilin City, Jilin, China.

History
Guanyin Ancient Temple was built in 1753 in the 18th year of Emperor Qianlong's reign during the Qing dynasty (1644–1911), and underwent two renovations, respectively in 1938 and in 1980. In 1983, the temple was listed among the National Key Buddhist Temples in Han Chinese Area by the State Council of China.

Architecture
Now the well-preserved buildings include the Shanmen, Hall of Four Heavenly Kings, Hall of Guanyin, Mahavira Hall, Buddhist Texts Library, Dharma Hall, etc.

Buddhist Texts Library
The Buddhist Texts Library collected 720 volumes of Chinese Buddhist canon, which was printed in 1735 in the 13th year of Yongzheng era of the Qing dynasty (1644–1911). There are only two sets of 1735 woodcut prints Chinese Buddhist canon in China.

References

Bibliography
 

Buddhist temples in Jilin
Buildings and structures in Jilin
Tourist attractions in Jilin
1938 establishments in China
20th-century Buddhist temples
Religious buildings and structures completed in 1938
Guanyin temples